Oleh Ihorovych Pestryakov (born 5 August 1974) is a Ukrainian professional football coach and a former player.

Club career
He made his professional debut in the Ukrainian Second League in 1992 for FC Yavir Krasnopilya.

Honours
 Ukrainian Premier League champion: 2002.
 Ukrainian Premier League runner-up: 2000, 2001, 2003.

European club competitions
 UEFA Intertoto Cup 1999 with FC Rostselmash Rostov-on-Don: 4 games.
 2002–03 UEFA Champions League qualification with FC Shakhtar Donetsk: 1 game.

References

1974 births
People from Yevpatoria
Living people
Ukrainian footballers
Association football midfielders
Ukrainian expatriate footballers
FC Spartak Sumy players
PFC CSKA Moscow players
FC Arsenal Kyiv players
FC Rostov players
FC Shakhtar Donetsk players
FC Spartak Moscow players
FC Metalurh Zaporizhzhia players
SC Tavriya Simferopol players
Expatriate footballers in Russia
Russian Premier League players
Ukrainian Premier League players
Ukrainian First League players